The Prime Minister of the Republic of South Ossetia, officially known as the Chairman of the Government, is the de facto head of government of the partially recognized Republic of South Ossetia that is de jure part of Georgia. This is a list of the de facto prime ministers of the Republic of South Ossetia.

List of prime ministers of South Ossetia

See also
President of South Ossetia

References

Sources
 Rulers of South Ossetia
Rulers.org: South Ossetia
 Osinform: Thirteen South Ossetian PMs (2 November 2008)

South Ossetia
South Ossetia
Government of Ossetia